Antje Nikola Mönning (born 2 February 1978) is a German actress.

Career 
Born in Lüdinghausen, Mönning studied acting from 1999 until 2002 at the Schauspiel München actors' studio. Her first television role was in the 2003 crime series Die Wache on RTL. This was followed by a string of other supporting and leading roles on German television, most notably in 2008 and 2009 as a nun in the ARD series Um Himmels Willen. Apart from her television and film work, she also appeared on several German and other European stages and toured the US with a musical. After appearing throughout her career in several short films, she co-produced and played a lead role in the 2009 film  (lit.: Angel With Dirty Wings), directed by Roland Reber. In 2009, Mönning was a jury member at the Sitges Film Festival in Spain.

Mönning lived together with Roland Reber, his wife, and the actress Marina Anna Eich. Mönning coproduced and played a leading role in Reber's 2012 film Die Wahrheit der Lüge (The Truth of the Lie).

Mönning again collaborated with director Roland Reber, co-writing and starring in the 2017 film Der Geschmack von Leben (Taste of Life). Mönning portrays Nikki, the protagonist.

References

External links
WTP International profile

1978 births
21st-century German actresses
German film actresses
German stage actresses
German television actresses
Living people
People from Lüdinghausen